Abhogi is a raga in Carnatic music and has been adapted to Hindustani music. It is a pentatonic scale, an audava raga. It is a derived scale (janya raga), as it does not have all the seven swaras (musical notes). Ābhōgi has been borrowed from Carnatic music into Hindustani music and is also quite popular in the latter.

Theory 

The Carnatic raga Abhogi is a symmetric pentatonic scale that does not contain panchamam and nishadam. It is called an audava-audava raga, as it has 5 notes in both ascending and descending scales. Its  structure is as follows:

 : 
 : 

The notes used are shadjam, chathusruti rishabham, sadharana gandharam, shuddha madhyamam and chathusruthi dhaivatham. Ābhōgi is considered a janya raga of Kharaharapriya, the 22nd Melakarta raga, though it can be derived from Gourimanohari too, by dropping both panchamam and nishadam.

Graha bhedam 
Graha bhedam is the step taken in keeping the relative note frequencies same, while shifting the shadjam to another note in the rāgam. Abhogi's notes, when shifted using Graha bhedam, yields another pentatonic rāgam, Valaji.  For more details and illustration of this concept refer Graha bhedam on Ābhōgi.

According to P.Moutal, the raga Kalavati is a transposition of Abhogi.

Scale similarities 
 Sriranjani is a rāgam which has kaishiki nishadam in both ascending and descending scales in addition to the notes in Ābhōgi. Its  structure is  : 
 Shuddha Saveri is a rāgam which has the panchamam in place of the gandharam. Its  structure is  :

Notable compositions 
Abhogi is a raga used for compositions in a medium to fast tempo. It has been used by many composers in classical music and film music. Notable traditional compositions in Abhogi include:

 Nannu brova nee kinta tāmasamā in Adi tala by Thyagaraja
 Anugalavu Chinte, Maneyolagaado By Purandara Dasa
 Śri Lakṣhmi varāham by Muthuswami Dikshitar
 Sabhāpatikku veru daivam, in Rupaka tala by Gopalakrishna Bharati
 Neekepudu in Khanḍa Tripuṭa tala by Mysore Sadashiva Rao
 Evvari bodhana, a popular varnam by Patnam Subramania Iyer
 Manasu nilpa by Thyagaraja
 Nekkurugi unnai by Papanasam Sivan
 Sri Mahaganapathe by N S Ramachandran
 Manujudai Putti by Annamacharya

In Hindustani music 

The Carnatic raga was incorporated relatively recently into Hindustani classical music where it is known as Abhogi Kanada or simply, Abhogi. The Kanada indicates its origin as a member of the Kanada group. Abhogi Kanada is assigned to the Kafi thaat.

The Carnatic and Hindustani Abhogis have almost identical arohanas and avarohanas. However, one major differences is that the Carnatic raga uses the Kanada vakra (out of sequence) phrase  in a straight manner.

Theory 
Pa and Ni are omitted. Also Re is often omitted in ascent. Flat Ga is often approached from Ma in ascent and has a slight oscillation to show the typical Kanada. In descent often the typical Kanada phrase  is used.

 Arohana (order of ascending notes in the scale): 
 Avarohana (order of descending notes in the scale):  or 
 Vadi: 
 Samavadi: 
 Jeeva Swaras:  and 
 Pakad or Chalan: GMDS SDRSDMD_ D_SRGRS D_RSDM GMMDDSDRSD_M GMD_MGGRR_ GRSd Rd_S
 Samay (Time): Night, approximately 9PM-12AM.
 Thaat: Kafi

Related ragas: Bageshree. However, Bageshree also includes flat Ni and a limited use of Pa, which gives a different flavour.

Compositions 
Hindustani compositions of note in Abhogi Kanada include:

 Par gaya chahai sab koi in Ektal by Raidas
 Jayati siri radhike in Jhaptal by Gadadhar Bhatt
 Ek barajori kare saiyya in Jhumratal

Important recordings 
 Amir Khan, Ragas Bilaskhani Todi and Abhogi, HMV/AIR LP (long-playing record), EMI-ECLP2765

Film songs

In Tamil language

See also 

 List of Film Songs based on Ragas

Notes

References

Sources

External links 
 

Hindustani ragas
Janya ragas (kharaharapriya)
Janya ragas